The Georgia Tech Quantum Institute is a multi-disciplinary research center within the Georgia Tech Research Institute and the Georgia Institute of Technology that focuses on research within quantum computing and related fields.

History
In 2010, researchers produced microfabricated planar ion traps for theoretical use in a trapped ion quantum computer.

References

External links
 Official website

Quantum Institute
Quantum information science